Hockey Club Davos is a professional Swiss ice hockey club based in Davos, Switzerland. Davos plays in the National League (NL). It is generally referred to by its abbreviation "HCD" by the fans. The team is usually a strong force in the league and often bolster their roster with Swiss national team players and players who once played for National Hockey League teams. HC Davos also has hosted the annual Spengler Cup tournament, an invitational competition, since 1923.

The team had the lowest attendance of the National League for the 2016–17 season, averaging 4,792 spectators over their 25 regular season home games.

History
HC Davos was founded in 1921. In 1923, Davos presented the first Spengler Cup, one of the oldest tournaments in sports still being played. 

HC Davos was led by a forward line known as "The ni-storm" from 1933 to 1950, which included Bibi Torriani, along with brothers Hans Cattini and Ferdinand Cattini. The line was named for the last syllable (-ni) of players' surnames. The ni-storm was regarded as the top line of HC Davos and the Switzerland men's national ice hockey team from 1933 to 1950. During this time, the club won 18 Swiss championships, and six Spengler Cups.

The team was relegated into 1. Liga in 1990, one of the lowest points in its history. After a new beginning, the club moved into the Swiss League, and two years later returned to the NL. Davos has been among the best teams in the league since, with recent league championships in 2002, 2005, 2007, 2009, 2011, and 2015.

Honors

Champions
NL Championships (31): 1926, 1927, 1929, 1930, 1931, 1932, 1933, 1934, 1935, 1937, 1938, 1939, 1941, 1942, 1943, 1944, 1945, 1946, 1947, 1948, 1950, 1958, 1960, 1984, 1985, 2002, 2005, 2007, 2009, 2011, 2015

Invitational
Spengler Cup (15): 1927, 1933, 1936, 1938, 1941, 1942, 1943, 1951, 1957, 1958, 2000, 2001, 2004, 2006, 2011

Runners-up
NL Championship (12): 1924, 1925, 1928, 1936, 1956, 1957, 1959, 1982, 1986, 1998, 2003, 2006
Spengler Cup (25): 1924, 1925, 1926, 1929, 1930, 1935, 1937, 1944, 1945, 1946, 1947, 1948, 1953, 1955, 1960, 1969, 1981, 1993, 1994, 1996, 1998, 2002, 2003, 2009, 2012

Players

Current roster

Notable alumni

 Reto Berra (2008–2009)
 Alexandre Daigle (2007–2010)
 Radek Dvořák (2013)
 Loui Eriksson (2013)
 Pat Falloon (2001)
 Niklas Hagman (2005)
 Jonas Hiller (2001–2003, 2005–2007)
 Jonas Höglund (2004)
 Patrick Kane (2012 Spengler Cup only)
 Alexander Khavanov (2007)
 Rick Nash (2005, 2012)
 Joe Thornton (2005, 2012, 2020)

Franchise scoring leaders
These are the top-ten point-scorers in franchise history. Figures are updated after each completed NL/SL/MySports League/ regular season.

''Note: Pos = Position; GP = Games played; G = Goals; A = Assists; Pts = Points; P/G = Points per game

References

External links

HC Davos official site 
Spengler Cup official site 

 
Ice hockey teams in Switzerland
Sport in Davos